Vicente Ítalo Feola (20 November 1909 – 6 November 1975) was a Brazilian football manager and coach from São Paulo. He became famous for leading the Brazilians to their first FIFA World Cup title in 1958.

Biography 
Feola was born in São Paulo to Italian parents. He died in 1975 aged 65.

Coaching career

São Paulo 
As São Paulo FC coach, Feola won the 1948 and 1949 Campeonato Paulista.

Brazil

1958 World Cup 
As Seleção boss in 1958, Feola introduced a 17-year-old Pelé to the footballing world, winning the FIFA World Cup in Sweden, the first and to date only time a non-European side has won a World Cup on European soil. The team trained in Hindås in Sweden during the tournament (pictured).

Boca Juniors 
Feola was appointed manager of Argentine club Boca Juniors briefly in 1961.

Brazil return

1966 World Cup 
Feola returned as coach of the Brazil national team for the 1966 FIFA World Cup in England. In the first round of the tournament, Brazil lost their second game against Hungary. Pelé, although still recovering, was brought back for the last crucial match against Portugal for which Feola, panicked. He changed the entire defence, including the goalkeeper. In the attack, he maintained Jairzinho and substituted the other two players. In the midfield, he returned to the formation of the first match, even knowing that Pelé was still not fully recovered from his serious injuries. Brazil suffered a first round elimination. Under Feola's command, Brazil played 74 times, having won 55 games, tied 13 and lost 6 times.

Honours

Manager

Club 
São Paulo FC
Campeonato Paulista: 1948, 1949

International 
Brazil
FIFA World Cup: 1958

References

Further reading 
Enciclopédia do Futebol Brasileiro, Volume 2 – Lance, Rio de Janeiro: Aretê Editorial S/A, 2001.

1909 births
1975 deaths
São Paulo FC players
São Paulo FC managers
Brazilian people of Italian descent
Brazilian football managers
Brazil national football team managers
Sportspeople from São Paulo
1958 FIFA World Cup managers
1966 FIFA World Cup managers
FIFA World Cup-winning managers
Boca Juniors managers
Expatriate football managers in Argentina
Association football midfielders
Brazilian footballers